Jennings Franciskovic (born May 10, 1995) is an American volleyball player.

Sporting achievements
 National championships
 2017/2018  Italian Championship, with Modena Volley
 2018/2019  Italian SuperCup, with Modena Volley
 National team
 2015  U21 Pan-American Cup

References

External links
 Player profile at LegaVolley.it
 Player profile at Volleybox.net
 Hawaii Rainbow Warriors 2017 Roster – Jennings Franciskovic

1995 births
Living people
Sportspeople from Chicago
American men's volleyball players
American expatriate volleyball players
American expatriate sportspeople in Italy
Expatriate volleyball players in Italy
Hawaii Rainbow Warriors volleyball players
Modena Volley players
Blu Volley Verona players